Barthruhari is a 1944 Indian Tamil language historical drama film produced by K. Subrahmanyam, who co-directed it with C. S. V. Iyer. The film stars Serukalathur Sama and B. Jayamma, with G. Pattu Iyer, N. S. Krishnan, V. N. Janaki and T. A. Mathuram in supporting roles. Based on the life of the king Bharthari, it was released on 13 April 1944 and failed commercially.

Plot 
King Barthruhari is married to 300 wives. He spends most of his time with the youngest of them and his most favourite, Pingala. The chief groom of the king's horses, Aswapaalan resorts to thievery to satisfy the needs of his mistress, Sundari. The people who were robbed complain to the king, who decides to find the culprit and punish him. Through sheer happenstance, Aswapaalan meets Pingala and both start having an extramarital affair without the king's knowledge.

Vikramadityan, the king's brother, catches Aswapaalan one night and puts him in custody in Pingala's palace. To escape from the situation lest her affair with Aswapaalan is discovered, complains to Barthruhari that Vikramadityan tried to seduce her, which Vikramadityan denies. The king immediately banishes Vikramadityan without looking into the matter properly. Later, the king realises that his younger brother was telling the truth when he sees Aswapaalan and Pingala together. Shocked and aggrieved, he gives up his throne, brings Vikramadityan back and crowns him as the new king. Barthruhari then becomes a hermit and retires to the forest to do penance.

Cast 
Serukalathur Sama as Barthruhari
B. Jayamma as Pingala
G. Pattu Iyer as Vikramadityan
N. S. Krishnan as Aswapaalan
V. N. Janaki as Pingala's companion
T. A. Mathuram as Sundari

Production 
K. Subrahmanyam co-produced the film under his own banner Madras United Artistes Corporation with Kalaivani Films. C. V. Ramakrishnan worked as the film's cinematographer. Both Nagoor and S. R. Sarma were in charge of the production design. Principal photography for the film was done at Newtone Studio.

Bharthruhari featured intimate romance sequences between Jayamma and Krishnan which, according to film critic and historian Randor Guy, "people thought was in bad taste" and that it was "certainly far ahead of the times". The scenes generated negative controversy for the film, Jayamma and Krishnan and created an adverse impact on its box office performance.

Soundtrack 
V. S. Parthasarathy Iyengar composed the film's music and score while Papanasam Sivan, Rajagopal Iyer and Udumalai Narayana Kavi wrote the lyrics for the songs. Jayamma and Krishnan sang a duet in the film.

Some songs
 Neere Neere Maaran – B. Jayamma
 Umaiyodu – Serukalathur Sama, B. Jayamma

Release and reception 
Barthruhari was released on 13 April 1944, and was distributed by SIP. The film received neither positive critical response nor commercial success, and became controversial for the intimate scenes between Jayamma and Krishnan.

Notes

References 

1944 drama films
1944 films
Films about infidelity
Films directed by K. Subramanyam
Indian black-and-white films
Indian historical drama films
1940s Tamil-language films
1940s historical drama films